Giannis Zaradoukas (born 12 December 1985) is a Greek professional footballer who plays as a left back for Koropi.

Club career
On loan from Panathinaikos in 2007–08, Zaradoukas helped Panserraikos earn promotion from Beta Ethniki to the Greek Super League.

Following his successful season with Panserraikos, Panathinaikos loaned Zaradoukas to Ethnikos Piraeus – another strong Beta Ethniki club trying to earn promotion to the Super League – for the 2008–09 season.

In September 2011, Zaradoukas was released on free transfer, due to the relegation of Olympiakos Volou for involvement in match-fixing scandals and signed a 2-year contract with Olympiakos F.C. On 29 December 2011 he signed a six-month loan deal with PAS Giannina, as he didn't feature in the plans of his coach. He scored his first goal for Pas Giannina against Kerkyra on 4 February 2012. On 18 January 2013, he signed a six-month loan with Aris. He made his debut 2 days later in a home draw against AEK.

In June 2013, Zaradoukas was released from Olympiakos, and he signed a two-years contract with Asteras Tripolis. He made his debut with the club on 18 August 2013 in a home draw against PAS Giannina. At the beginning of 2014, Zaradoukas signed a six-month contract with Platanias and made his debut with the club on 3 March 2014 in a 1–2 home loss against PAS Giannina. On 10 July 2015, Zaradoukas was released from Platanias.

In July 2015, Zaradoukas signed a contract with Skoda Xanthi for an undisclosed fee 
 and on 27 July 2016, he signed a year contract with Kerkyra. On 11 July 2017, he signed a season contract with Levadiakos F.C.

International career
On 10 August 2011, he debuted for the Greece national team, after a call-up by national coach Fernando Santos in a friendly match against Bosnia and Herzegovina.  His first competitive match for the national team was during a successful 1–0 win against Israel for the EURO 2012 qualification round.

Honours
Panserraikos
 Beta Ethniki: 2007–08
Olympiacos:
Superleague Greece: 2012–13
Greek Cup: 2013

References

1985 births
Living people
Greece international footballers
Footballers from Athens
Greek footballers
Super League Greece players
Football League (Greece) players
Panathinaikos F.C. players
Panserraikos F.C. players
Ethnikos Piraeus F.C. players
Olympiacos Volos F.C. players
Olympiacos F.C. players
PAS Giannina F.C. players
Aris Thessaloniki F.C. players
Asteras Tripolis F.C. players
Platanias F.C. players
Xanthi F.C. players
PAE Kerkyra players
Association football defenders